Geno Delafose (born February 6, 1971) is an American zydeco accordionist and singer. He is one of the younger generations of the genre who has created the sound known as the nouveau zydeco. His sound is deeply rooted in traditional Creole music with strong influences from Cajun music and also country and western. His father was the fellow zydeco accordion player, John Delafose.

History
Delafose was born and raised in Eunice, Louisiana. At the age of eight, he joined his father's band, the Eunice Playboys as a rubboard player and continued to play with the band until his father's death in 1994. He also appeared on several of the band's recordings. He switched to the accordion in the early 1990s and started to play as an opening act for his father.

In 1994, he debuted with album French Rockin' Boogie on Rounder Records. The name of this album also became the name of his band with whom he still plays. He released two more albums on the label, before signing with Times Square Records to release Everybody's Dancin''' in 2003.

He has also appeared on the compilation album Creole Bred: A Tribute to Creole & Zydeco  released in 2004 by Vanguard Records.

He was nominated for a Grammy Award in the Best Zydeco or Cajun Music Album category for his 2007 album Le Cowboy Creole.

Delafose lives in Duralde, near Eunice, Louisiana, where he operates his Double D Ranch raising cattle and horses. He also holds fan appreciation parties annually at the ranch.

 Discography 
1994 - French Rockin' Boogie (Rounder)
1996 - That's What I'm Talkin' About! (Rounder)
1998 - La Chanson Perdue (Rounder)
2003 - Everybody's Dancin' (Times Square)
2007 - Le Cowboy Creole'' (Times Square)

References

External links 
Official site
 
 
Geno's page on Ritmo Artists
LSU Eunice website on Geno
Interview in Rootsworld magazine
World Music Central biography
Geno Delafose & French Rockin' Boogie Photo Gallery

1972 births
Living people
American accordionists
Cajun accordionists
Louisiana Creole people
People from Eunice, Louisiana
Rounder Records artists
Singers from Louisiana
Zydeco musicians
21st-century accordionists
21st-century African-American male singers
20th-century African-American male singers